The 2021 MEAC men's basketball tournament was the postseason men's basketball tournament for the 2020–21 season in the Mid-Eastern Athletic Conference (MEAC). The tournament took place from March 11–13, 2021. The tournament winner received an automatic invitation to the 2021 NCAA Division I men's basketball tournament.

Seeds
In a deviation from the format used in previous years, the 2021 edition of the tournament seeded teams using their divisional placement, rather than their finish in the conference as a whole.

Schedule

Source

Bracket

Notes

References

Tournament
MEAC men's basketball tournament
Basketball competitions in Norfolk, Virginia
College basketball tournaments in Virginia
MEAC men's basketball tournament
MEAC men's basketball tournament